John Herriott (October 20, 1844 – September 24, 1918)  was an American politician and lawyer who served as a Lieutenant Governor from Iowa.

Life

Born in Herriottsville, Pennsylvania, in Allegheny County, Pennsylvania, Herriott served in the Union Army during the American Civil War as a member of the 1st Pennsylvania Cavalry Regiment and participated in the Battles of Fredericksburg and Gettysburg. 

Herriott moved to Iowa, where he served leader of the Guthrie County Republican Party and as Iowa State Treasurer and then Lieutenant Governor of Iowa from 1902 until 1907, serving under Governor Albert B. Cummins. In 1901 he ran for the Republican nomination for governor of Iowa and came second to last with only 8 delegates against Cummins 860, however he won the Lieutenant Governor nomination after two ballots.

On September 24, 1918, he died in Des Moines, Iowa. His son was Frank Irving Herriott.

References

1844 births
1918 deaths
People from South Fayette Township, Allegheny County, Pennsylvania
Iowa Republicans
Lieutenant Governors of Iowa
State treasurers of Iowa
19th-century American politicians
People of Pennsylvania in the American Civil War
Union Army soldiers